Metropolitan Community College (MCC) is a public community college system in the U.S. state of Missouri. The system consists of five separate campuses in Kansas City, Independence, and Lee's Summit. The campuses had a total enrollment of 15,770 in 2019. Their athletic teams are known as the Wolves.

History
MCC is the oldest public college in greater Kansas City, having been established in 1915 as Kansas City Polytechnic Institute with its campus at 11th Street and Locust initially offering a junior college, a teacher training school, a high school, a mechanic arts school, a trade school, and a business training school. It was one of the first schools in the country to issue a two-year associate degree, and it was the third school in the country to be accredited by the North Central Association of Colleges and Schools in 1918. It changed its name to Junior College of Kansas City in 1919.

In 1964 the suburban schools of Belton, Center, Grandview, Hickman Mills, Lee's Summit, North Kansas City, and Raytown joined the Kansas City school district to form the Metropolitan Community College District and took over management of the school from the Kansas City School District to form the College Board of Trustees.  The  Blue Springs, Park Hill, Independence, and Fort Osage school districts joined the network in the 1980s and 1990s.

The Longview, Maple Woods, and Penn Valley campuses were formed in 1969.   The Blue River campus opened in 1997 and the Business & Technology campus opened in 2002 with the entire institution formally being called Metropolitan Community College in 2005.

Campuses
Prior to the consolidation of the Metropolitan name the campuses had their own local name (e.g., Longview Community College, Maple Woods Community College, Penn Valley Community College).

MCC-Blue River campus is located in Independence, Missouri. The college joined the MCC system in 1997. As of 2010, the campus serves over 3,500 students per semester. In addition to a host of general education programs, the MCC-Blue River is home to stellar music and theatre programs. The Metropolitan Chorale of Kansas City performs both locally and nationally throughout the year. Blue River's Public Safety Institute includes peace officers, firefighter, and EMT-paramedic training. Campus sports consist of a men's and a women's soccer team - the Trailblazers.

MCC-Longview is located in Lee's Summit, Missouri. It opened in 1969. In 2001, Longview was selected as a TIME magazine/The Princeton Review "College of the Year"; it received the award in recognition of its Writing Across the Curriculum program. Frank White is the school's most notable alumnus. Its baseball team won the 2007 NJCAA Division II Baseball Championship. By 2016 the campus was serving nearly 3,000 students.
MCC-Maple Woods was founded in 1969. Located in northern Kansas City, the campus is known for its liberal arts offerings and its veterinary technology program. This northernmost MCC campus serves around 5,400 students every year. In 2007, the school mascot was changed from the Centaurs to the Monarchs, in recognition of the Kansas City Negro league baseball team of the same name. Maple Woods sports teams include men's baseball, women's softball, and both men and women's soccer. Albert Pujols played baseball for Maple Woods before being drafted by the St. Louis Cardinals in 1999.
MCC-Penn Valley, in Penn Valley Park, was founded in 1969.  Located in midtown Kansas City, the campus features general education courses as well as many health career programs. The campus is also home to the Francis Child Development Institute and the Carter Art Center. Around 6,000 students attend Penn Valley every fall. Its basketball team, the Scouts, won the 1996 NJCAA Men's Division II Basketball Championship and was runner-up in 1997 and 2002. In 1991, Penn Valley hosted the seventh Science Olympiad National Tournament, which was won by Grandville Junior High School from Michigan and La Jolla High School from California.

Programs
MCC Institute for Workforce Innovation - Since 1985, MCC has worked with local companies to provide training, recruitment, evaluations and other professional services, contracting with employers such as Harley-Davidson, Honeywell, Ford, GM, Folgers, and Smith Electric Vehicles.  Services expanded to include database management, quality control, assessment, human resource services, and contract training, including OSHA and safety management.  In 2009, MCC combined its workforce development efforts with economic development, resource development, and community development to create the MCC Institute for Workforce Innovation (IWI). IWI also targets incumbent and displaced workers and disadvantaged populations such as minorities and rural residents, providing short-term career training, job placement, counseling, and basic skills development for over 4,000 students a year.  Currently, IWI contracts with over 80 companies in the region, and for two years in a row, has been ranked in the Kansas City Business Journals Top 25 Area Consulting Firms.

Notable alumni
 Edward F. Arn, Kansas governor
 William M. Boyle, Democratic National Committee chairman
 George H. Clay, president of Kansas City Federal Reserve
 Blevins Davis, theatrical producer
 David F. Duncan, drug policy advisor to President Bill Clinton; professor at Brown University
 S. George Ellsworth, LDS historian
 Jack Gentry (entrepreneur), founder of Positronic
 Clay Johnson, basketball player
 Ewing Marion Kauffman, founder of Marion Laboratories, original owner of the Kansas City Royals, and philanthropist
 Brent Lasater, Republican member of the Missouri House of Representatives
 Robert L. J. Long, four-star admiral
 Logan Morrison, baseball player
 Dale D. Myers, NASA administrator
 Irene C. Peden, engineer who was the first woman to live and work in interior Antarctica
 Albert Pujols, baseball player 
 Casey Stengel, baseball player and manager
 Maxwell D. Taylor,  United States Army officer and diplomat 
 Mort Walker, creator of Beetle Bailey cartoon (1942)
 Charles Wheeler (politician), Kansas City mayor
 Frank White, baseball player and coach
 Brian C. Wimes, federal judge

References

External links
 Official website

Community colleges in Missouri
Kansas City metropolitan area
Universities and colleges in Kansas City, Missouri
Buildings and structures in Independence, Missouri
Educational institutions established in 1969
Education in Jackson County, Missouri
Buildings and structures in Jackson County, Missouri
1969 establishments in Missouri
NJCAA athletics
Two-year colleges in the United States